Germany has commissioned over 1,500 U-boats into its various navies from 1906 to the present day. The submarines have usually been designated with a U followed by a number, although World War I coastal submarines and coastal minelaying submarines used the UB and UC prefixes, respectively. When Germany resumed building submarines in the 1930s, the numbering of the submarines was restarted at 1. The renumbering was restarted at 1 a third time when Germany resumed building submarines in the 1960s.

World War I–era U-boats 

There were some 380 U-boats commissioned into the Kaiserliche Marine in the years before and during World War I. Although the first four German U-boats—, and —were commissioned before 1910, all four served in a training capacity during the war. German U-boats used during World War I were divided into three series. The U designation was generally reserved for ocean-going attack torpedo U-boats. The UB designation was used for coastal attack U-boats, while the UC designation was reserved for coastal minelaying U-boats.

U-boats 
U-boats designed primarily for deep water service were designated with a U prefix and numbered up to 167.

Type U 1

Type U 2

Type U 3

Type U 5

Type U 9

Type U 13

Type U 16

Type U 17

Type U 19

Type U 23

Type U 27

Type U 31

Type U 43

Type U 51

Type U 57

Type U 63

Type U 66 (Type UD)

The Type U 66 submarines were originally constructed for Austro-Hungary as the U-7 class, but were sold to Germany at the start of WWI.

Type UE I (Type U 71)

Type U 81

Type U 87

Type U 93

Type U 115

Type UE II (Type U 117)

Type U 127

Type Large MS (Type U 135)

Type U 139

Type U 142

Type U 151 (Deutschland Class submarine)

Type U 158

UB coastal U-boats 
Coastal attack torpedo U-boats were smaller craft intended for operation closer to land. They were designated with a UB prefix and numbered up to 155.

Type UB I

 UB-1
 UB-2
 UB-3
 UB-4
 UB-5
 UB-6
 UB-7
 UB-8
 UB-9
 UB-10
 UB-11
 UB-12
 UB-13
 UB-14
 UB-15
 UB-16
 UB-17

Type UB II

 UB-18
 UB-19
 UB-20
 UB-21
 UB-22
 UB-23
 UB-24
 UB-25
 UB-26
 UB-27
 UB-28
 UB-29
 UB-30
 UB-31
 UB-32
 UB-33
 UB-34
 UB-35
 UB-36
 UB-37
 UB-38
 UB-39
 UB-40
 UB-41
 UB-42
 UB-43
 UB-44
 UB-45
 UB-46
 UB-47

Type UB III

 UB-48
 UB-49
 UB-50
 UB-51
 UB-52
 UB-53
 UB-54
 UB-55
 UB-56
 UB-57
 UB-58
 UB-59
 UB-60
 UB-61
 UB-62
 UB-63
 UB-64
 UB-65
 UB-66
 UB-67
 UB-68
 UB-69
 UB-70
 UB-71
 UB-72
 UB-73
 UB-74
 UB-75
 UB-76
 UB-77
 UB-78
 UB-79
 UB-80
 UB-81
 UB-82
 UB-83
 UB-84
 UB-85
 UB-86
 UB-87
 UB-88
 UB-89
 UB-90
 UB-91
 UB-92
 UB-93
 UB-94
 UB-95
 UB-96
 UB-97
 UB-98
 UB-99
 UB-100
 UB-101
 UB-102
 UB-103
 UB-104
 UB-105
 UB-106
 UB-107
 UB-108
 UB-109
 UB-110
 UB-111
 UB-112
 UB-113
 UB-114
 UB-115
 UB-116
 UB-117
 UB-118
 UB-119
 UB-120
 UB-121
 UB-122
 UB-123
 UB-124
 UB-125
 UB-126
 UB-127
 UB-128
 UB-129
 UB-130
 UB-131
 UB-132
 UB-133
 UB-134
 UB-135
 UB-136
 UB-137
 UB-138
 UB-139
 UB-140
 UB-141
 UB-142
 UB-143
 UB-144
 UB-145
 UB-146
 UB-147
 UB-148
 UB-149
 UB-150
 UB-151
 UB-152
 UB-153
 UB-154
 UB-155

UC coastal minelaying U-boats 

Coastal minelaying U-boats were smaller vessels intended to mine enemy harbors and approaches. They were designated with a UC prefix and numbered up to 114.

Type UC I

 UC-1
 UC-2
 UC-3
 UC-4
 UC-5
 UC-6
 UC-7
 UC-8
 UC-9
 UC-10
 UC-11
 UC-12
 UC-13
 UC-14
 UC-15

Type UC II

 UC-16
 UC-17
 UC-18
 UC-19
 UC-20
 UC-21
 UC-22
 UC-23
 UC-24
 UC-25
 UC-26
 UC-27
 UC-28
 UC-29
 UC-30
 UC-31
 UC-32
 UC-33
 UC-34
 UC-35
 UC-36
 UC-37
 UC-38
 UC-39
 UC-40
 UC-41
 UC-42
 UC-43
 UC-44
 UC-45
 UC-46
 UC-47
 UC-48
 UC-49
 UC-50
 UC-51
 UC-52
 UC-53
 UC-54
 UC-55
 UC-56
 UC-57
 UC-58
 UC-59
 UC-60
 UC-61
 UC-62
 UC-63
 UC-64
 UC-65
 UC-66
 UC-67
 UC-68
 UC-69
 UC-70
 UC-71
 UC-72
 UC-73
 UC-74
 UC-75
 UC-76
 UC-77
 UC-78
 UC-79

Type UC III

Thirty-five Type UC III submarines were planned, but only 25 were completed. Nine of these (UC-106 to UC-114) were never commissioned and were awarded to the United Kingdom and France and broken up in 1921. Ten of these (UC-80 to UC-89) were broken up at yard

 UC-80
 UC-81
 UC-82
 UC-83
 UC-84
 UC-85
 UC-86
 UC-87
 UC-88
 UC-89
 
 UC-91
 UC-92
 UC-93
 UC-94
 UC-95
 UC-96
 UC-97
 UC-98
 UC-99
 UC-100
 UC-101
 UC-102
 UC-103
 UC-104
 UC-105

Foreign U-boats
At the outbreak of World War I Germany took charge of a number of submarines under construction in German shipyards for other countries.

  (ex-Norwegian A class submarine A-5)
 U-66 to U-70 (ex-Austro-Hungarian U-7 class U-7 to U-11)
 US-1 (ex-Russian Bars class Burevestnik), only test run - not in service
 US-2 (ex-Russian Bars class Orlan), Commissioned later abandoned to White Russian Forces
 US-3 (ex-Russian Bars class Utka), only test run - not in service
 US-4 (ex-Russian Bars class Gagara), only test run - not in service

World War II U-boats 

In the World War II era, Germany commissioned some 1,250 U-boats into the Kriegsmarine.

Type I

Type II

Type IIA

Type IIB

 U-7
 U-8
 U-9
 U-10
 U-11
 U-12
 U-13
 U-14
 U-15
 U-16
 U-17
 U-18
 U-19
 U-20
 U-21
 U-22
 U-23
 U-24
 U-120
 U-121

Type IIC

 U-56
 U-57
 U-58
 U-59
 U-60
 U-61
 U-62
 U-63

Type IID

 U-137
 U-138
 U-139
 U-140
 U-141
 U-142
 U-143
 U-144
 U-145
 U-146
 U-147
 U-148
 U-149
 U-150
 U-151
 U-152

Type VII

Type VIIA

 U-27
 U-28
 U-29
 U-30
 U-31
 U-32
 U-33
 U-34
 U-35
 U-36

Type VIIB

 U-45
 U-46
 U-47
 
 
 U-50
 
 U-52
 
 
 
 U-73
 U-74
 U-75
 U-76
 U-83
 U-84
 U-85
 U-86
 U-87
 U-99
 U-100
 U-101
 U-102

Type VIIC

 U-69
 U-70
 U-71
 U-72
 U-77
 U-78
 U-79
 U-80
 U-81
 U-82
 U-88
 U-89
 U-90
 U-91
 U-92
 U-93
 U-94
 U-95
 U-96
 U-97
 U-98
 U-132
 U-133
 U-134
 U-135
 U-136
 U-201
 U-202
 U-203
 U-204
 U-205
 U-206
 U-207
 U-208
 U-209
 U-210
 U-211
 U-212
 U-221
 U-222
 U-223
 U-224
 U-225
 U-226
 U-227
 U-228
 U-229
 U-230
 U-231
 U-232
 U-235
 U-236
 U-237
 U-238
 U-239
 U-240
 U-241
 U-242
 U-243
 U-244
 U-245
 U-246
 U-247
 U-248
 U-249
 U-250
 U-251
 U-252
 U-253
 U-254
 U-255
 U-256
 U-257
 U-258
 U-259
 U-260
 U-261
 U-262
 U-263
 U-264
 U-265
 U-266
 U-267
 U-268
 U-269
 U-270
 U-271
 U-272
 U-273
 U-274
 U-275
 U-276
 U-277
 U-278
 U-279
 U-280
 U-281
 U-282
 U-283
 U-284
 U-285
 U-286
 U-287
 U-288
 U-289
 U-290
 U-291
 U-301
 U-302
 U-303
 U-304
 U-305
 U-306
 U-307
 U-308
 U-309
 U-310
 U-311
 U-312
 U-313
 U-314
 U-315
 U-316
 U-331
 U-332
 U-333
 U-334
 U-335
 U-336
 U-337
 U-338
 U-339
 U-340
 U-341
 U-342
 U-343
 U-344
 U-345
 U-346
 U-347
 U-348
 U-349
 U-350
 U-351
 U-352
 U-353
 U-354
 U-355
 U-356
 U-357
 U-358
 U-359
 U-360
 U-361
 U-362
 U-363
 U-364
 U-365
 U-366
 U-367
 U-368
 U-369
 U-370
 U-371
 U-372
 U-373
 U-374
 U-375
 U-376
 U-377
 U-378
 U-379
 U-380
 U-381
 U-382
 U-383
 U-384
 U-385
 U-386
 U-387
 U-388
 U-389
 U-390
 U-391
 U-392
 U-393
 U-394
 U-395
 U-396
 U-397
 U-398
 U-399
 U-400
 U-401
 U-402
 U-403
 U-404
 U-405
 U-406
 U-407
 U-408
 U-409
 U-410
 U-411
 U-412
 U-413
 U-414
 U-415
 U-416
 U-417
 U-418
 U-419
 U-420
 U-421
 U-422
 U-423
 U-424
 U-425
 U-426
 U-427
 U-428
 U-429
 U-430
 U-431
 U-432
 U-433
 U-434
 U-435
 U-436
 U-437
 U-438
 U-439
 U-440
 U-441
 U-442
 U-443
 U-444
 U-445
 U-446
 U-447
 U-448
 U-449
 U-450
 U-451
 U-452
 U-453
 U-454
 U-455
 U-456
 U-457
 U-458
 U-465
 U-466
 U-467
 U-468
 U-469
 U-470
 U-471
 U-472
 U-473
 U-474
 U-475
 U-476
 U-477
 U-478
 U-479
 U-480
 U-481
 U-482
 U-483
 U-484
 U-485
 U-486
 U-551
 U-552
 U-553
 U-554
 U-555
 U-556
 U-557
 U-558
 U-559
 U-560
 U-561
 U-562
 U-563
 U-564
 U-565
 U-566
 U-567
 U-568
 U-569
 U-570
 U-571
 U-572
 U-573
 U-574
 U-575
 U-576
 U-577
 U-578
 U-579
 U-580
 U-581
 U-582
 U-583
 U-584
 U-585
 U-586
 U-587
 U-588
 U-589
 U-590
 U-591
 U-592
 U-593
 U-594
 U-595
 U-596
 U-597
 U-598
 U-599
 U-600
 
 
 
 
 
 
 
 
 
 
 
 
 
 
 
 
 
 
 
 
 
 
 
 
 
 
 
 
 
 
 
 
 
 
 
 
 
 
 
 
 
 
 
 
 
 
 
 
 
 
 
 
 
 
 
 
 
 
 
 
 
 
 
 
 
 
 
 
 
 
 
 
 
 
 
 
 
 
 
 
 
 
 
 U-684
 U-685
 U-686
 U-701
 U-702
 U-703
 U-704
 U-705
 U-706
 U-707
 U-708
 U-709
 U-710
 U-711
 U-712
 U-713
 U-714
 U-715
 U-716
 U-717
 U-718
 U-719
 U-720
 U-721
 U-722
 U-731
 U-732
 U-733
 U-734
 U-735
 U-736
 U-737
 U-738
 U-739
 U-740
 U-741
 U-742
 U-743
 
 U-745
 U-746
 U-747
 U-748
 U-749
 U-750
 U-751
 U-752
 U-753
 U-754
 U-755
 U-756
 U-757
 U-758
 U-759
 U-760
 U-761
 U-762
 U-763
 U-764
 U-765
 U-766
 U-767
 U-768
 U-771
 U-772
 U-773
 U-774
 U-775
 U-776
 U-777
 U-778
 U-779
 U-780
 U-781
 U-782
 U-821
 U-822
 U-823
 U-824
 U-825
 U-826
 U-901
 U-902
 U-903
 U-904
 U-905
 U-906
 U-907
 U-908
 U-921
 U-922
 U-923
 U-924
 U-925
 U-926
 U-927
 U-928
 U-951
 U-952
 U-953
 U-954
 U-955
 U-956
 U-957
 U-958
 U-959
 U-960
 U-961
 U-962
 U-963
 U-964
 U-965
 U-966
 U-967
 U-968
 U-969
 U-970
 U-971
 U-972
 U-973
 U-974
 U-975
 U-976
 U-977
 U-978
 U-979
 U-980
 U-981
 U-982
 U-983
 U-984
 U-985
 U-986
 U-987
 U-988
 U-989
 U-990
 U-991
 U-992
 U-993
 U-994
 U-1051
 U-1052
 U-1053
 U-1054
 U-1055
 U-1056
 U-1057
 U-1058
 U-1101
 U-1102
 U-1131
 U-1132
 U-1161
 U-1162
 U-1191
 U-1192
 U-1193
 U-1194
 U-1195
 U-1196
 U-1197
 U-1198
 U-1199
 U-1200
 U-1201
 U-1202
 U-1203
 U-1204
 U-1205
 U-1206
 U-1207
 U-1208
 U-1209
 U-1210

Type VIIC/41

 U-292
 U-293
 U-294
 U-295
 U-296
 U-297
 U-298
 U-299
 U-300
 U-317
 U-318
 U-319
 U-320
 U-321
 U-322
 U-323
 U-324
 U-325
 U-326
 U-327
 U-328
 U-329
 U-330
 U-687
 U-688
 U-689
 
 U-723
 U-724
 U-827
 U-828
 U-929
 U-930
 U-931
 U-932
 U-995
 U-996
 U-997
 U-998
 U-999
 U-1000
 U-1001
 U-1002
 U-1003
 U-1004
 U-1005
 U-1006
 U-1007
 U-1008
 U-1009
 U-1010
 U-1011
 U-1012
 U-1013
 U-1014
 U-1015
 U-1016
 U-1017
 U-1018
 U-1019
 U-1020
 U-1021
 U-1022
 U-1023
 U-1024
 U-1025
 U-1026
 U-1027
 U-1028
 U-1029
 U-1030
 U-1031
 U-1032
 U-1063
 U-1064
 U-1065
 U-1103
 U-1104
 U-1105
 U-1106
 U-1107
 U-1108
 U-1109
 U-1110
 U-1133
 U-1134
 U-1135
 U-1136
 U-1163
 U-1164
 U-1165
 U-1166
 U-1167
 U-1168
 U-1169
 U-1170
 U-1171
 U-1172
 U-1173
 U-1174
 U-1175
 U-1176
 U-1177
 U-1178
 U-1179
 U-1271
 U-1272
 U-1273
 U-1274
 U-1275
 U-1276
 U-1277
 U-1278
 U-1279
 U-1280
 U-1281
 U-1282
 U-1301
 U-1302
 U-1303
 U-1304
 U-1305
 U-1306
 U-1307
 U-1308

Type VIID

 U-213
 U-214
 U-215
 U-216
 U-217
 U-218

Type VIIF

 U-1059
 U-1060
 U-1061
 U-1062

Type IX

Type IXA

 U-37
 U-38
 U-39
 U-40
 U-41
 U-42
 U-43
 U-44

Type IXB

 U-64
 U-65
 U-103
 U-104
 U-105
 U-106
 U-107
 U-108
 U-109
 U-110
 U-111
 U-122
 U-123
 U-124

Type IXC

 U-66
 U-67
 U-68
 U-125
 U-126
 U-127
 U-128
 U-129
 U-130
 U-131
 U-153
 U-154
 U-155
 U-156
 U-157
 U-158
 U-159
 U-160
 U-161
 U-162
 U-163
 U-164
 U-165
 U-166
 U-171
 U-172
 U-173
 U-174
 U-175
 U-176
 U-501
 U-502
 U-503
 U-504
 U-505
 U-506
 U-507
 U-508
 U-509
 U-510
 U-511
 U-512
 U-513
 U-514
 U-515
 U-516
 U-517
 U-518
 U-519
 U-520
 U-521
 U-522
 U-523
 U-524

Type IXC/40

 
 U-168
 U-169
 U-170
 U-183
 U-184
 U-185
 U-186
 U-187
 U-188
 U-189
 U-190
 U-191
 U-192
 U-193
 U-194
 U-525
 U-526
 U-527
 U-528
 U-529
 U-530
 U-531
 U-532
 U-533
 U-534
 U-535
 U-536
 U-537
 U-538
 U-539
 U-540
 U-541
 U-542
 U-543
 U-544
 U-545
 U-546
 U-547
 U-548
 U-549
 U-550
 U-801
 U-802
 U-803
 U-804
 U-805
 U-806
 U-807
 U-808
 U-841
 U-842
 U-843
 U-844
 U-845
 U-846
 U-853
 U-854
 U-855
 U-856
 U-857
 U-858
 U-865
 U-866
 U-867
 U-868
 U-869
 U-870
 U-877
 U-878
 U-879
 U-880
 U-881
 U-882
 U-889
 U-890
 U-891
 U-892
 U-1221
 U-1222
 U-1223
 U-1224
 U-1225
 U-1226
 U-1227
 U-1228
 U-1229
 U-1230
 U-1231
 U-1232
 U-1233
 U-1234
 U-1235

Type IXD

 U-177
 U-178
 U-179
 U-180
 U-181
 U-182
 U-195
 U-196
 U-197
 U-198
 U-199
 U-200
 U-847
 U-848
 U-849
 U-850
 U-851
 U-852
 U-859
 U-860
 U-861
 U-862
 U-863
 U-864
 U-871
 U-872
 U-873
 U-874
 U-875
 U-876
 U-883

Type X (XB)

Originally intended as long-range minelayers, the Type X were later used as long-range cargo transports. 

 U-116
 U-117
 U-118
 U-119
 U-219
 U-220
 U-233
 U-234

Type XI
The Type XI was a planned artillery boat, armed with four 128-mm guns in two twin turrets along with an Arado Ar 231 floatplane. Four boats were laid down in 1939 but were cancelled at the outbreak of WWII.

U-112
U-113
U-114
U-115

Type XIV

The Type XIV submarine was a shortened version of the Type IXD and used as tankers. Twenty-four were planned, but only 10 were commissioned; three (U-491 to U-494) were cancelled before completed and eleven were never laid down. This type was nicknamed Milchkuh (milk cow).

 U-459
 U-460
 U-461
 U-462
 U-463
 U-464
 U-487
 U-488
 U-489
 U-490
 U-491
 U-492
 U-493
 U-494
 U-495
 U-496
 U-497

Type XVII

Type XVIIA
 U-792
 U-793
 U-794
 U-795

Type XVIIB
Twelve Type XVIIB submarines were planned, but only three were completed; three were cancelled at the end of the war before completion and six were cancelled in favor of the Type XXI submarine.

 U-1405
 U-1406
 U-1407

Type XVIIK
 U-798

Type XVIII
The Type XVIII was a projected attack boat using the Walter propulsion system. Two boats were laid down in 1943, but construction was cancelled in March 1944.

 U-796
 U-797

Type XXI

 U-2501
 U-2502
 U-2503
 U-2504
 U-2505
 U-2506
 U-2507
 U-2508
 U-2509
 U-2510
 U-2511
 U-2512
 U-2513
 U-2514
 U-2515
 U-2516
 U-2517
 U-2518
 U-2519
 U-2520
 U-2521
 U-2522
 U-2523
 U-2524
 U-2525
 U-2526
 U-2527
 U-2528
 U-2529
 U-2530
 U-2531
 U-2533
 U-2534
 U-2535
 U-2536
 U-2538
 U-2539
 U-2540
 U-2541
 U-2542
 U-2543
 U-2544
 U-2545
 U-2546
 U-2548
 U-2551
 U-2552
 U-3001
 U-3002
 U-3003
 U-3004
 U-3005
 U-3006
 U-3007
 U-3008
 U-3009
 U-3010
 U-3011
 U-3012
 U-3013
 U-3014
 U-3015
 U-3016
 U-3017
 U-3018
 U-3019
 U-3020
 U-3021
 U-3022
 U-3023
 U-3024
 U-3025
 U-3026
 U-3027
 U-3028
 U-3029
 U-3030
 U-3031
 U-3032
 U-3033
 U-3034
 U-3035
 U-3037
 U-3038
 U-3039
 U-3040
 U-3041
 U-3044
 U-3501
 U-3502
 U-3503
 U-3504
 U-3505
 U-3506
 U-3507
 U-3508
 U-3509
 U-3510
 U-3511
 U-3512
 U-3513
 U-3514
 U-3515
 U-3516
 U-3517
 U-3518
 U-3519
 U-3520
 U-3521
 U-3522
 U-3523
 U-3524
 U-3525
 U-3526
 U-3527
 U-3528
 U-3529
 U-3530

Type XXIII

 U-2321
 U-2322
 U-2323
 U-2324
 U-2325
 U-2326
 U-2327
 U-2328
 U-2329
 U-2330
 U-2331
 U-2332
 U-2333
 U-2334
 U-2335
 U-2336
 U-2337
 U-2338
 U-2339
 U-2340
 U-2341
 U-2342
 U-2343
 U-2344
 U-2345
 U-2346
 U-2347
 U-2348
 U-2349
 U-2350
 U-2351
 U-2352
 U-2353
 U-2354
 U-2355
 U-2356
 U-2357
 U-2358
 U-2359
 U-2360
 U-2361
 U-2362
 U-2363
 U-2364
 U-2365
 U-2366
 U-2367
 U-2368
 U-2369
 U-2371
 U-4701
 U-4702
 U-4703
 U-4704
 U-4705
 U-4706
 U-4707
 U-4709
 U-4710
 U-4711
 U-4712

Midget submarines

Biber

Molch

Seehund (Type XVIIB)

The range of U-5000 to U-6442 was specifically allocated to German midget submarines.  The following Seehund Type XXVIIB U-boats were entered into the Kriegsmarine registry as commissioned vessels

 U-5001
 U-5002
 U-5003
 U-5004
 U-5005
 U-5006
 U-5007
 U-5008
 U-5009
 U-5010
 U-5011
 U-5012
 U-5013
 U-5014
 U-5015
 U-5016
 U-5017
 U-5018
 U-5019
 U-5020
 U-5021
 U-5022
 U-5023
 U-5024
 U-5025
 U-5026
 U-5027
 U-5028
 U-5029 
 U-5030 
 U-5031
 U-5032 
 U-5033 
 U-5034 
 U-5035 
 U-5036
 U-5037 
 U-5038 
 U-5039 
 U-5040 
 U-5041 
 U-5042 
 U-5043 
 U-5044 
 U-5045 
 U-5046 
 U-5047 
 U-5048
 U-5049 
 U-5050 
 U-5051 
 U-5052 
 U-5053 
 U-5054
 U-5055 
 U-5056 
 U-5057 
 U-5058 
 U-5059 
 U-5060
 U-5061
 U-5062 
 U-5063 
 U-5064 
 U-5065 
 U-5066 
 U-5067 
 U-5068 
 U-5069 
 U-5070 
 U-5071 
 U-5072
 U-5073 
 U-5074 
 U-5075 
 U-5076 
 U-5077 
 U-5078 
 U-5079 
 U-5080 
 U-5081 
 U-5082 
 U-5083 
 U-5084
 U-5085
 U-5086
 U-5087 
 U-5088 
 U-5089 
 U-5090 
 U-5091 
 U-5092 
 U-5093
 U-5094 
 U-5095 
 U-5096
 U-5097 
 U-5098 
 U-5099 
 U-5100 
 U-5101 
 U-5102 
 U-5103 
 U-5104 
 U-5105 
 U-5106 
 U-5107 
 U-5108
 U-5109
 U-5110
 U-5111 
 U-5112 
 U-5113 
 U-5114 
 U-5115 
 U-5116 
 U-5117 
 U-5118 
 U-5251 
 U-5252
 U-5253 
 U-5254 
 U-5255 
 U-5256 
 U-5257 
 U-5258 
 U-5259 
 U-5260 
 U-5261 
 U-5262 
 U-5263
 U-5264
 U-5265 
 U-5266
 U-5267 
 U-5268 
 U-5269
 U-5330

Foreign U-boats 

Germany captured and commissioned 14 submarines from six countries into the Kriegsmarine during World War II.

Turkey
 

United Kingdom
 UB

Norway
 UC-1
 UC-2

Netherlands
 UD-1
 UD-2
 UD-3
 UD-4
 UD-5

France
 UF-1
 UF-2
 UF-3

Italy
 UIT-22
 UIT-23
 UIT-24
 UIT-25

Post–World War II U-boats

Type XXI
  (ex U-2540)

Type XXIII

 (ex U-2365)
 (ex U-2367)

Type 201

  (S180)
  (S181)
  (S182)

Type 205

  (S180)
  (S181)
 U-4 (S183)
 U-5 (S184)
 U-6 (S185)
 U-7 (S186)
 U-8 (S187)
 U-9 (S188)
 U-10 (S189)
 U-11 (S190)
 U-12 (S191)

Type 206

U-13 (S192)
 U-14 (S193)
 U-15 (S194)
 U-16 (S195)
 U-17 (S196)
 U-18 (S197)
 U-19 (S198)
 U-20 (S199)
 U-21 (S170)
 U-22 (S171)
 U-23 (S172)
 U-24 (S173)
 U-25 (S174)
 U-26 (S175)
 U-27 (S176)
 U-28 (S177)
 U-29 (S178)
 U-30 (S179)

Type 212

 U-31 (S181)
 U-32 (S182)
 U-33 (S183)
 U-34 (S184)
 U-35 (S185)
 U-36 (S186)

See also 
 List of U-boats never deployed
 List of German U-boat WW2 Raiding Careers
 List of naval ships of Germany
 :Category:Type II U-boats
 :Category:Type IX U-boats
 :Category:Type VII U-boats
 :Category:Type XIV U-boats
 :Category:Type XXI U-boats
 List of ships of the Second World War
 List of submarines of the Second World War

External links 
 List of U-boats at U-boat.net

U-boat
U-boats
Submarines of Germany
U-boats
Uboat
Uboat